Partou Zia (9 October 1958 – 19 March 2008) was a British-Iranian artist and writer. Born in Tehran, she emigrated to England in 1970, where she completed her secondary education at Whitefields school near Hendon, London (1972–78). Zia studied Art History at the University of Warwick (1977–80) and at the Slade School of Fine Art (1986–91). In 2001, she completed a PhD at Falmouth College of Arts and the University of Plymouth. In 1993, she moved to Cornwall where she lived and worked with her husband, the painter Richard Cook, until her death from cancer, in March 2008. Tate St Ives honoured her parting by hanging one of her last completed canvases, Forty Nights and Forty Days as a memorial to her, for a month, at the gallery's entrance.

In 2003, Tate St Ives initiated a pioneering residency programme at the historic Porthmeor Studios in St Ives, Cornwall, previously occupied by Borlase Smart, Ben Nicholson and Patrick Heron. Zia was the first recipient of this award  and her exhibition at Tate St Ives was accompanied by a catalogue 'Entering the Visionary Zone'.

Work 
Early in Partou’s career, landscape provided the main inspiration for her work. The quest of the individual for the divine was a developing theme. A fascination for religious iconography was manifested in depictions of the overlooked corners of church interiors. Everyday objects such as books, lamps and chairs inhabited her images of domestic scenes, suggesting a desire to capture the essence of her long-lost childhood home. Her canvases at this time were dominated by an energetic application of heavily impastoed yellow, which for her represented the spiritual. Self-portraits, some of them nude, also formed an important part of her oeuvre, not only as a means of asserting her identity as a woman and a painter, but in order to reveal her intuitive self.

Partou's canvases bring a fresh note to the long established tradition of story telling. In scale her works range from a few inches to several feet high, with characteristic free brushwork and an immediately recognisable energetic handling of layers of paint. She has been inspired by the writing and illustrations of William Blake, and her work explores a personal journey of self-discovery. Through these vibrant, painterly canvases, she draws the viewer into her dream like memory. Her own language is highly original, evolving a personal mythology of motifs and symbols that include lovers, sleepers, dreamers and readers, set within evocative interiors or luminous landscapes.

The paintings from the last few months of her life reflect a change of mood. The intense energy of her earlier canvases has given way to a more contemplative application of paint, as a consequence of her failing strength. In ‘40 Nights and 40 Days’ she reclines, in classical garb, resting her elbow on a pile of books – an indication, perhaps, that her work is done. She seems to be gazing beyond the present, the outstretched hand ready to guide her on the next step of her journey.

Solo exhibitions 

2013
Portraits Beyond Self, Art First, London

2008
In The Face of Wonder, The Exchange, Penzance 
Memorial Exhibition, Art First, London

2007
Art First, London

2005
The Grey Syllable, Art First, London

2004
Thought Paintings, Art First, London

2003
Entering the Visionary Zone, Tate St Ives

2002
Art Space Gallery, London

2000
Art Space Gallery, London
     Plymouth Art Centre

1999
Royal Cornwall Museum

1998
Newlyn Art Gallery

1997
Thornton-Bevan Arts, London

Group exhibitions 

2010
Meetings Of Dreams, The Wills Lane Gallery, St. Ives

2009
ZOOM – Looking Back/Looking Forward, Art First, London

2007
Art Now Cornwall, Tate St. Ives, Cornwall

2006
12x12 Art First, London

2004
Spoilt for Choice: A Christmas Show, Art First, London

1999
Four Young Artists, Art Space, London

1998
In/Sight, Exeter University

1997
Gallery Artists I, Reeds Wharf Gallery, London
A Sense of Place, Collyer Bristow Gallery, London

1996
Landscapes from Penwith, Hastings Museum and Gallery

1996
Spring Open, Connaught Brown, London

1995
John Moores Exhibition 19, Walker Art Gallery, Liverpool

1994
Response to Landscape, Beatrice Royal Gallery, Southampton

1993
Salthouse Gallery, St Ives

1992
Carpenters Road Studios, London

1990
Works on Paper, The Boundary Gallery, London

1989Young Contemporaries, Whitworth Gallery, Manchester

Selected collections 

 The British Museum, London

References

External links 
 eBook - Partou Zia - Portraits Beyond Self   
 Platform 505 Article - Portraits Beyond Self
 Cornwall artists index
 Guardian artist of the month
 Women artists in Cornwall - Partou Zia ~ Painter of Dreams
 TATE MODERN - Talk - Vision is Out There

1958 births
2008 deaths
20th-century English painters
21st-century English painters
English women painters
St Ives artists
Alumni of the Slade School of Fine Art
Alumni of the University of Warwick
Iranian artists
Iranian emigrants to the United Kingdom
People from Tehran
20th-century British women artists
21st-century British women artists
Alumni of the University of Plymouth
20th-century English women
21st-century English women